Assam is a state in northeastern India.

General

School education in Assam     is imparted through a number of pre-primary, primary, middle, high and higher secondary schools   The Government of Assam  has implemented free and compulsory education for students up to the age of 18. Schools in Assam are either state run or under the management of private organisations  . The syllabus at primary schools is established by the Directorate of Elementary Education, Assam. While most schools are affiliated to SEBA, there are several schools in the state affiliated to the CBSE or NENBSE. The Higher education List of institutions of higher education in Assam

Medium of instruction

The language used for instruction is Assamese, Bodo, Bengali, English, and Hindi.  Many State Government  affiliated schools and all the CBSE affiliated schools in the state use English as their medium of instruction at the Higher Secondary level. English is the medium of instruction in almost all higher educational institutions.

See also 
 List of institutions of higher education in Assam

References